Vápenice may refer to places in the Czech Republic:

Vápenice (Uherské Hradiště District), a municipality and village in the Zlín Region
Vápenice (natural monument), a natural monument in the Olomouc Region
Vápenice, a village and part of Obory in the Central Bohemian Region
Vápenice, a village and part of Vysoký Chlumec in the Central Bohemian Region